Canton Viaduct is a blind arcade cavity wall railroad viaduct in Canton, Massachusetts, built in 1834–35 for the Boston and Providence Railroad (B&P).

At its completion, it was the longest and tallest railroad viaduct in the world; today, it is the last surviving viaduct of its kind. It has been in continuous service for  years; it now carries high-speed passenger and freight rail service. The stream pool passes through six semi-circular portals in the viaduct.

The viaduct was the final link built for the B&P's then  mainline between Boston, Massachusetts; and Providence, Rhode Island.  Today, the viaduct serves Amtrak's Northeast Corridor, as well as Massachusetts Bay Transportation Authority (MBTA) Providence/Stoughton Line commuter trains.  It sits 0.3 miles (0.5 km) south of Canton Junction, at milepost 213.74, reckoned from Pennsylvania Station in New York City, and at the MBTA's milepost 15.35, reckoned from South Station in Boston.

Inception

The Canton Viaduct was erected in 1835 by the Boston and Providence Railroad (B%P), one of the first New England railroads, shortly after its 1831 founding. It was designed by a U.S. Army Corps of Engineers Officer and West Point graduate - Captain William Gibbs McNeill.  He was assisted by engineers, Major George Washington Whistler (McNeill's brother-in-law), Major General Isaac Ridgeway Trimble and General William Raymond Lee. McNeill and Whistler were the uncle and father of the artist James McNeill Whistler. The viaduct was built by the Dodd & Baldwin company from Pennsylvania; the firm was established by cousins Ira Dodd and Caleb Dodd Baldwin. Around this time, Russia was interested in building railroads.  Tsar Nicholas I sent workmen to draw extensive diagrams of the Canton Viaduct.  He later summoned Whistler to Russia as a consulting engineer to design the Moscow–Saint Petersburg Railway, on which two viaducts were modeled after the Canton Viaduct.  A scale model viaduct of similar design is on display at the Oktyabrsky Railroad Museum in St. Petersburg.

Design and construction

Classification 
This Canton Viaduct is the first and possibly only viaduct to use both a blind arcade and cavity wall structure.  Although the deck arches appear to extend through to other side, they do not; each deck arch is only four feet deep.  The deck arches support the spandrels, deck (beyond the walls), coping and parapets; they are not tied to the longitudinal walls.  The only arches that extend through to the other side are six river portals and two roadway portals.  The 'buttresses' are also unique in that they extend through to the other side, so they are actually transverse walls.

Materials

The Canton Viaduct contained 14,483 cubic feet (15,800 perches) of granite, which weighs approximately  prior to its concrete redecking in 1993. Each stone has a Mason's mark to identify who cut the stone. Each course is 22" - 24" high and laid in a pattern closely resembling a Flemish bond.  Exterior stone for the walls, wing wall abutments, portals, deck arches, coping, parapets and the foundation stone are riebeckite granite mined from Moyles quarry (a.k.a. Canton Viaduct Quarry) located on the westerly slope of Rattlesnake Hill in Sharon, Massachusetts; now part of Borderland State Park.

Location

The majority of the viaduct is over land (71%), while 29% is over water. In addition to the six river portals, one roadway portal was originally provided. The distance between the transverse walls at this section is wider than all the other sections of the viaduct. This makes the west wall slightly shorter than the east wall producing a slight keystone shape in the cavities. Originally unnamed, it was referred to as "the stone bridge" and "the viaduct at Canton" before it was eventually named after the town. The foundation stone was laid on Sunday, April 20, 1834, with a Masonic Builders' rites ceremony. Following to Masonic tradition, the foundation stone was located in the northeast corner of the structure.

Construction

The Canton Viaduct cost $93,000 to build ($ today). Construction took 15 months, 8 days from laying of the foundation stone on April 20, 1834, to completion on July 28, 1835.

The first and last transverse walls (next to the wing wall abutments) are only 3 feet wide, all the other transverse walls are 5 feet, 6 inches wide.  The wing wall abutments are 25 feet wide where they meet the viaduct; they are curved and stepped and were excavated by William Otis using his first steam shovel.  From the top of the wing walls to midway down, the stones are of 2' wide; from midway down to the bottom of the wing walls the stones are 4' wide.

The coping is supported by 42 segmental deck arches (21 on each side) that span the tops of 22 transverse walls beyond the longitudinal walls.  The longitudinal walls are five feet thick with a four-foot gap between them joined with occasional tie stones.  More construction details are available in the original .  When the viaduct had a single set of tracks, the rails were placed directly over the longitudinal walls as the cavity's width is less than standard gauge.  When the viaduct was double tracked in 1860, the inside rails were placed directly over the longitudinal walls and the outside rails were supported by the deck arches.

The viaduct was "substantially complete" in June 1835 from various accounts of horse-drawn cars passing over it during that time.  The viaduct was built before the advent of construction safety equipment such as hard hats and fall arrest devices.  Surprisingly, no deaths were recorded during the construction, but deaths have occurred at the viaduct since completion; mainly from people crossing it while trains passed in opposite directions.  Charlie, the old white horse who had hauled the empty railcars back to Sharon, Massachusetts (4 miles), was placed upon the flat car and hauled across the viaduct by the workers, thus becoming the first "passenger" to cross the structure.

A June 6, 1835, article in the Providence Journal describes it.  As reported by the Boston Advertiser and the Providence Journal,  "Whistler" was the first engine to pass over the entire length of the road.

Aside from seasonal vegetation control and occasional graffiti removal, the viaduct requires no regular maintenance other than periodic bridge inspections from Amtrak.

Dedication Stone

The capstone was laid in the south end of the west parapet.  This stone sat atop the Dedication Stone and it was the last stone to be laid in the viaduct.

The Dedication Stone is actually two stones now held together with two iron straps on each end.  The overall dimensions are approximately 60" long × 36" high × 18" wide, and it weighs approximately 3,780 lbs.  The Dedication Stone was originally topped with a 63" long × 8" high × 24" wide capstone with double beveled edges, creating an irregular hexagonal profile.  Due to its breaking in 1860, the Dedication Stone is about 1" shorter today than its original height.  The damage obscured two directors' names, W. W. Woolsey and P. T. Jackson.  Woolsey was also a Director of the Boston & Providence Railroad & Transportation Co. (B&P RR&T Co.) in Rhode Island (incorporated  May 10, 1834) which owned the Rhode Island portion of the Boston and Providence rail line.  The B&P RR&T Co. merged with the B&P on June 1, 1853.

Railroad track
During the 1993 deck renovation, two 18-inch-deep troughs were discovered recessed into the granite deck stones running the entire length of the viaduct and spaced at standard gauge width ( inches).  The troughs contained longitudinal baulks and were part of the original construction.  The baulks supported the rails without the need for transoms as the gauge was maintained by the longitudinal troughs.  This is the only known instance of transomless baulks recessed in granite slabs; the original tracks before and after the viaduct used baulks making the B&P originally a baulk railroad.  A 1910 photo taken atop the viaduct shows dirt between the cross ties and tracks, so this material may have been used before traditional gravel ballast.

Baulks were used to support strap rails or bridge rail.  These early rails would have been replaced with flanged T-rails by 1840.  These photos show baulks at Canton Junction in 1871.  An 1829 report from the Massachusetts Board of Directors of Internal Improvements describes how the railroad from Boston to Providence was to be built.  The report states, "It consists of one pair of tracks composed of long blocks of granite, about one foot square, resting upon a foundation wall extending to the depth of ' below the surface of the ground, and 2' wide at the bottom".  The report also calls for using horse-drawn wagons and carriages at 3 MPH on the rail line, not steam locomotives.

Construction sequence
The Canton Viaduct was constructed in the following sequence:
Planning
Design and specifications
Preconstruction
Site preparation, mobilization, surveying, excavation (using timber piling), river diversion (using cofferdams)
Construction
Wing wall abutments - foundations and walls (using scaffolding)
Temporary train platforms and embankment staircases at abutments
Walls:
Foundations - the Foundation Stone was the first stone to be laid on April 20, 1834 (northeast corner) with Masonic Builders' rites ceremony
Walls and portals (using falsework)
Deck arches (using falsework)
Spandrels
Cavity slabs
Deck slabs (with longitudinal troughs) and coping
Parapets - the capstone was the final stone to be laid at the southwest end with Masonic ceremony
Post Construction
Track installation - baulks, rail and ballast - the first "passenger" was Charlie, the workhorse
Site cleanup and demobilization
Opening ceremony - July 28, 1835.  The first train, "Whistler" passed over the Canton Viaduct at approximately 5:00 PM local solar time.

Waterway

Spillway Dam at Neponset Street, also known as Canton Viaduct Falls, impounds Mill Pond.  It is a weir or low head dam that is owned by the MBTA.  The 16' high by 90' long granite dam was built in 1900; as of 2009, it averages  annual discharge.  Water power was supplied to nearby businesses via water wheel from the canal starting at the waterfall's enclosed plunge pool and continuing about 200' under the Neponset St. bridge.  There were also two channels located between the viaduct and the waterfall (one on each side) referred to as sluices, headraces and flumes in various maps.  They were filled in sometime after 1937 (U.S. Army Corps of Engineers National Inventory of Dams No. ).

Ownership
1834–1888, Boston & Providence Railroad Corp.
1888–1893, Old Colony Railroad Co.
1893–1969, New York, New Haven and Hartford Railroad Co.
1969–1973, Penn Central Transportation Company
1973–present, Massachusetts Bay Transportation Authority

Critical infrastructure
World War I - A detachment of the 9th Regiment National Guard arrived in April 1917 to guard the viaduct from sabotage, via sentry duty.
World War II - Canton's Civil Defense Corps and railroad employees guarded the viaduct against sabotage since the train line is part of the direct link between Boston and New York City. The structure is a critical transportation link between the two cities and had extra protection as a result.
War on Terrorism - Shortly after the terrorist attacks of September 11, 2001 the Canton Viaduct was guarded by various security entities until the U.S. threat level decreased.

In a letter to Canton's Board of Selectmen on February 27, 2002, former Police Chief Peter Bright noted that Massachusetts Emergency Management Agency training for worst-case situations highlights the destruction of the Canton Viaduct for its disruption of the national railroad system; the Federal Government also considers the viaduct a high-risk target.

Recognition

The Canton Viaduct was listed on the National Register of Historic Places in 1984. 
The viaduct has been designated a National Historic Civil Engineering Landmark in 1998 by the American Society of Civil Engineers.

Current status

In June 2004 the town of Canton developed a Master Plan that identifies what should be preserved and enhanced to meet evolving needs and improve the quality of life.

Gallery

See also
National Register of Historic Places listings in Norfolk County, Massachusetts
List of bridges documented by the Historic American Engineering Record in Massachusetts
List of bridges on the National Register of Historic Places in Massachusetts

Footnotes

Further reading
Galvin, Edward, D. (1987). A History Of Canton Junction. Brunswick: Sculpin Publications. 
Fisher, Charles, E. (1917). A Little Story Of The Boston And Providence Railroad Company. 
Herrin, Dean, A. (2002). America Transformed: Engineering And Technology In The Nineteenth Century: Selections From The Historic American Engineering Record, National Park Service. Reston: American Society of Civil Engineers. 
Cook, Richard, J. (1987). The Beauty Of Railroad Bridges: In North America - Then And Now. San Marino: Golden West Books. 
Cleary, Richard, L. (2007). Bridges.  W.W. Norton & Co. 
Cramb, Ian. (2006), The Art Of The Stone Mason. Chambersburg: Hood & Co.  
Canton Bicentennial Historical Committee. (1997), Canton Comes Of Age 1797–1997: A History Of The Town Of Canton, Massachusetts. Canton: The Town of Canton 
Comeau, George, T. (2009). Canton - Postcard History Series. Mount Pleasant: Arcadia Publishing. 
Cox, Terry. (2003). Collectible Stocks And Bonds From North American Railroads: Guide With Prices. Arvada: TCox & Associates. 
Boothroy, Stephen, J. (2002). Down At The Station: Rail Lines Of Southern New England In Early Postcards. Cranberry Junction. 
Jackson, Donald, C. (1988). Great American Bridges And Dams. Wiley. 
Barber, John, W. (1844). Historical Collections, Being A General Collection Of Interesting Facts, Traditions, Biographical Sketches, etc., Relating To The History And Antiquities Of Every Town In Massachusetts, With Geographical Descriptions, Illustrated By 200 Engravings. Heritage Books. 
DeLony, Eric. (1993). Landmark American Bridges. Little Brown and Company. 
Middleton, William, D. (1999). Landmarks On The Iron Road: Two Centuries OF North American Railroad Engineering. Bloomington: Indiana University Press. 
Kirkland, Edward C. (1948). Men, Cities And Transportation - A Study In New England History 1820–1900 Volumes I-II. Cambridge: Harvard University Press. 
National Park Service. (1995). National Register Of Historic Places 1966 To 1994. Wiley. 
Solomon, Brian. (2008). North American Railroad Bridges. Voyageur Press. 
Adams, Charles, F. (1878). Railroads: Their Origin And Problems. Ayer Co. Publishing. 
Harlow, Alvin, F. (1946). Steelways Of New England. New York: Creative Age Press, Inc. *Rogers, Robert. (1952). 
Middleton, William D. "They're Still There: High Speed Rail's 1835 Underpinning," American Heritage of Invention and Technology, Spring 2001 Volume 16, Issue 4, pp 52–55
Parry, Albert. (1938). Whistler's Father. Foster Press.

External links

USDOT Crossing No. 537243N
USGS GNIS Feature ID: 
USNGS Permanent ID: 

Bridges completed in 1835
Blind arcade cavity wall bridges
Railroad bridges on the National Register of Historic Places in Massachusetts
Bridges over the Neponset River
Buildings and structures in Canton, Massachusetts
Bridges in Norfolk County, Massachusetts
CSX Transportation bridges
Dams in Massachusetts
Deck arch bridges in the United States
Historic Civil Engineering Landmarks
Landmarks in Canton, Massachusetts
Masonic memorials
MBTA Commuter Rail
Monuments and memorials in Massachusetts
New York, New Haven and Hartford Railroad bridges
Old Colony Railroad
Penn Central Transportation
Railroad bridges in Massachusetts
Stone bridges in the United States
Time capsules
Viaducts in the United States
Parks in Norfolk County, Massachusetts
National Register of Historic Places in Norfolk County, Massachusetts
Articles containing video clips
Concrete bridges in the United States
Brick bridges in the United States